Nouhair Al Shemari  is a kuwait football defender who played for Kuwait in the 2000 Asian Cup. He also played for Qadsia

External links
11v11 Profile

1979 births
Kuwaiti footballers
Living people
Place of birth missing (living people)
Association football defenders
Kuwait international footballers
Qadsia SC players
Kuwait Premier League players